Oh, Saigon is a 2007 autobiographical documentary by Vietnamese American director Doan Hoang about her family's separation during the fall of Saigon and her attempt to reunite them afterwards.  Oh, Saigon was executive produced by Academy Award and Emmy winner, John Battsek. Oh, Saigon received film grants from the Sundance Institute Documentary Fund, ITVS, and the Center for Asian American Media, and after its release, received a number of film festival awards and accolades.

Synopsis

Cast
The main characters in the film are the Hoang family:
 Nam Hoang as Nam - a South Vietnamese pilot who pulls his family out of Vietnam to settle in Kentucky
 Doan Hoang as Doan - Nam's daughter and the film's narrator.
 Hoang Hai as Hai - a Communist soldier who is Nam's older brother. 
 Hoang Dzung as Dzung - Nam's younger brother. He is a fisherman.
 Anne Hoang as Anne - Nam's wife. She was a socialite in Saigon, but after the relocation, she works as a seamstress.
 Van Tran as Van - Anne's daughter and Doan's secret half sister. On the day of the airlift, she is left behind.

Also includes the following family members:
 Nhat Hoang
 Dylan Tran Le

Development
Hoang developed the film over seven years, where she documented her family. In 2005, the Sundance Institute awarded Hoang a grant for the then titled Homeland. She also received funding from the Independent Television Service (ITVS), the Center for Asian American Media, and the Corporation for Public Broadcasting.

Filming was done in the United States and Saigon. According to the official website: "The subjects are shot on location in the expanse of America and its suburbs, as well as Saigon’s vibrant, noisy streets, and the rarely-seen breathtaking backwaters of Vietnam – emphasizing the physical differences between two countries that shared a war. Archival footage, moody Super8mm landscapes, and motion-graphics-animated family photographs juxtaposed to clear, colorful DV, shot in a fluid cinema verité–style highlight changes and similarities between past and present."

Release

Hoang premiered Oh, Saigon in March 2007 at the San Francisco International Asian American Film Festival She then showcased the film at various film festivals, universities, and museum venues.

Hoang took the film to 16 countries, including a tour of Spain in 2011 and 2012 tour of Vietnam for the US State Department and American Documentary Showcase.

The film is currently available to view on Netflix and Amazon.com.

Reception

Awards and nominations
Grand Jury Prize for Non-Fiction Feature Film – Los Angeles Asian Pacific Film Festival, May 2008
Best Documentary Award -  42nd Brooklyn Arts Council International Film Festival, May 2008
Best Brooklyn Film -  42nd Brooklyn Arts Council International Film Festival, May 2008
Best of the Fest – Austin Film Festival, February 2008
Best Documentary Nominee - San Francisco International Asian American Film Festival, March 2007
Grand Jury Prize Nominee – Vietnamese International Film Festival, April 2009

References

External links
  
 

2007 films
Documentary films about families
Documentary films about refugees
Documentary films about the Vietnam War
Autobiographical documentary films
2007 documentary films
Vietnamese documentary films
American documentary films
Vietnamese-language films
2000s English-language films
2000s American films